Red Forest is the second album by American post-rock band If These Trees Could Talk. It was independently released on March 20, 2012, pressed on vinyl by Science of Silence then re-released by Metal Blade in January 2015. The album was recorded from September to December 2011 at NEMeadow Studio in Bath by Zack Kelly and Rick Fuller, mixed by Zack Kelly and mastered by Will Putney.

Track listing

Personnel
If These Trees Could Talk
 Tom Fihe – bass
 Zack Kelly – drums
 Cody Kelly – guitar
 Jeff Kalal – guitar
 Mike Socrates – guitar
Production
 Zack Kelly – producer, engineering, mixing
 Rick Fuller – engineering, mixing
 Will Putney – mastering
 Charlie Wagers – art direction, design

References

2012 albums
If These Trees Could Talk albums
Self-released albums
Metal Blade Records albums